James Austin Johnson (born July 19, 1989) is an American comedian and actor originally from Nashville, Tennessee. He has garnered attention for his impression of former President Donald Trump, sometimes being referred to as "the best Trump impersonator." Johnson is currently a cast member on the NBC sketch comedy television series Saturday Night Live, which he joined as a featured player for the show's 47th season in 2021. On SNL, he impersonates both Trump and Joe Biden.

Career 
In addition to the films Blue Like Jazz and Hail, Caesar!, Johnson has appeared in the television series Adam Ruins Everything, Better Call Saul, and All Rise. He has also filmed a DirecTV television ad with National Football League veteran Peyton Manning.

In 2021, Johnson was cast as a featured player on Saturday Night Live, alongside fellow newcomers Aristotle Athari and Sarah Sherman, for its forty-seventh season. During the season premiere's cold open, he portrayed President Joe Biden and later portrayed former President Donald Trump in the season's fifth episode. Andy Hoglund, who recaps SNL episodes for Entertainment Weekly, said "he is one of the most exciting new cast members in years, a cross between Dana Carvey and Darrell Hammond. He's that kind of talent."

He is a member of the Democratic Socialists of America.

Filmography

Film

Television

References

External links
 
 

1989 births
Living people
Comedians from Tennessee
American male comedians
American male film actors
American male television actors
American male voice actors
American sketch comedians
American stand-up comedians
American impressionists (entertainers)
Members of the Democratic Socialists of America
21st-century American comedians
Male actors from Nashville, Tennessee
Trevecca Nazarene University alumni